Daisy Bopanna is an Indian actress who appears in Kannada, Hindi, Telugu and Tamil language films.

Personal life
Bopanna is from Kodagu. She attended Aurobindo School, pre-university at Kumarans College and graduated with a Bachelor of Fine Arts degree from Chitrakala Parishat in Bangalore, Karnataka. She married Amit Jaju in 2011.

Career
Daisy started with theatre, working for a short time with B. Jayashree's Spandana theatre camp and also contemporary English theatre. She began filming for Bimba in 2002. It was sent to the Berlin & Frankfurt Film Festival, and won international awards. Directed by Kavitha Lankesh, it explored the exploitation of child artistes in the film industry. Daisy's later work in Bhagawan (2004) with Darshan earned her the moniker 'Spicy Daisy'.

Filmography

References

External links

 

Living people
Indian film actresses
Actresses in Kannada cinema
Actresses in Hindi cinema
Actresses in Telugu cinema
Actresses in Tamil cinema
Actresses from Karnataka
People from Kodagu district
21st-century Indian actresses
Year of birth missing (living people)
Actresses in Malayalam cinema